Return to Earth is the second solo album by former Misfits vocalist Michale Graves, released on October 31, 2006. The album features the songs "Nobody Thinks About Me" and the long waited release of "Butchershop".

Track listing 
All songs written by Michale Graves.

References 

Michale Graves albums
2006 albums